Sunset is a city in Davis County, Utah, United States. It is part of the Ogden–Clearfield, Utah Metropolitan Statistical Area. The population was 5,122 at the 2010 census.

Sunset emerged as a distinct place in 1916.

Geography
Sunset is located in northern Davis County. It is bordered by Hill Air Force Base to the east, Clearfield to the south, Clinton to the west, and Roy in Weber County to the north.

Demographics

As of the census of 2010, there were 5,122 people, 1,734 households, and 1,298 families residing in the city. The population density was 3,909.9 people per square mile (1,510.9/km2). There were 1,826 housing units at an average density of 1,393.9 per square mile (538.6/km2). The racial makeup of the city was 83.33% White, 1.44% African American, 0.68% Native American, 2.38% Asian, 0.29% Pacific Islander, 7.18% from other races, and 4.69% from two or more races. Hispanic or Latino of any race were 15.33% of the population.

There were 1,734 households, out of which 43.9% had children under the age of 18 living with them, 52.1% were married couples living together, 14.0% had a female householder with no husband present, 66.5% of those with no husband lived with children, and 25.1% of households were non-families. 12.7% of all households were made up of individuals, and 7.4% had someone living alone who was 65 years of age or older. The average household size was 2.95 and the average family size was 3.37.

In the city, the population was spread out, with 31.8% under the age of 18, 9.2% from 18 to 24, 29.5% from 25 to 44, 17.2% from 45 to 64, and 12.2% who were 65 years of age or older. The median age was 29 years. For every 100 females, there were 102.8 males. For every 100 females age 18 and over, there were 97.9 males.

According to the 2018 American Community Survey, the median income for a household in the city was $59,476, and a per capita income of $25,380. Males had median earnings of $38,500 versus $25,160 for females.  About 7.1% of families and 11% of the population were below the poverty line, including 10.9% of those under age 18 and 4.5% of those age 65 or over.

References

External links
 City of Sunset official website

Cities in Davis County, Utah
Cities in Utah
Ogden–Clearfield metropolitan area
Populated places established in 1916